Nanning No.3 High School is a premier high school located in Nanning, Guangxi, China.

See also
 Nanning No.2 High School
 Liuzhou Senior High School

References 

High schools in Guangxi